John Jordan Wicker Jr. (December 31, 1893 – July 20, 1985) was an American lawyer and Democratic politician who served as a member of the Virginia Senate from 1932 to 1936, representing the City of Richmond. He served as the president of Fork Union Military Academy from 1930 to 1945. A founding member of the American Legion, he was elected the chairman of Virginia's 1945 Constitutional Convention which aimed to expand voting rights to members of the armed forces during wartime.

References

External links

1893 births
1985 deaths
Furman University alumni
Politicians from Richmond, Virginia
University of Richmond alumni
Democratic Party Virginia state senators
Lawyers from Richmond, Virginia
20th-century American politicians
20th-century American lawyers